Port Vincent may refer to:
 Port Vincent, Louisiana, a village in Livingston Parish, United States
 Port Vincent, South Australia, a small town on the east coast of Yorke Peninsula, Australia